Ken Howard (1944–2016) was an American actor

Ken or Kenneth Howard may also refer to:

 Ken Howard (artist) (1932–2022), British artist
 Kenny Howard (1929–1992), American artist
 Ken Howard (composer) (born 1939), British composer
 Ken Howard (priest) (born 1952), American priest
 Kenneth Howard, 1st Earl of Effingham (1767–1845), British peer
 Kenneth Howard (cricketer) (born 1941), English cricketer
 Kenneth S. Howard, American author of several books on chess problems